The 24 Hours of Daytona, also known as the Rolex 24 At Daytona for sponsorship reasons, is a 24-hour sports car endurance race held annually at Daytona International Speedway in Daytona Beach, Florida. It is run on the Sports Car Course layout, a  combined road course that uses most of the tri-oval plus an infield road course. Held on the last weekend of January or first weekend of February as part of Speedweeks, it is the first major automobile race of the year in North America. The race is sanctioned by IMSA and is the first race of the season for the IMSA SportsCar Championship.

The race has borne the names of several sponsors over the years. Since 1992, the Rolex Watch Company has been the title sponsor of the race, replacing Sunbank, which replaced Pepsi in 1984. Winning drivers of all classes receive a Rolex Daytona watch. 

The race has been known historically as a leg of the informal Triple Crown of endurance racing along with the 12 Hours of Sebring and 24 Hours of Le Mans.

Beginnings
Shortly after the track opened, on April 5, 1959, a six-hour/1000 kilometer USAC-FIA sports car race was held on the road course. Count Antonio Von Dory and Roberto Mieres won the race in a Porsche, shortened to 560.07 miles due to darkness. The race used a 3.81-mile layout, running counter-clockwise.

In 1962, a few years after the track was built, a 3-hour sports car race was introduced. Known as the Daytona Continental, it counted towards the FIA's new International Championship for GT Manufacturers. The first Continental was won by Dan Gurney, driving a 2.7L Coventry Climax-powered Lotus 19.  Gurney was a factory Porsche driver at the time, but the 1600-cc Porsche 718 was considered too small and slow for what amounted to a sprint race on a very fast course.
In the past, a car had to cross the finish line after 24 hours to be classified, which led to dramatic scenes where damaged cars waited in the pits or on the edge of the track close to the finish line for hours, then restarted their engines and crawled across the finish line one last time in order to finish after the 24 hours and be listed with a finishing distance, rather than dismissed with DNF (Did Not Finish). This was the case in the initial 1962 Daytona Continental (then 3 hours), in which Dan Gurney's Lotus 19 had established a lengthy lead when the engine failed with just minutes remaining. Gurney stopped the car at the top of the banking, just short of the finish line. When the three hours had elapsed, Gurney simply cranked the steering wheel to the left (toward the bottom of the banking) and let gravity pull the car across the line, to not only salvage a finishing position, but actually win the race. This led to the international rule requiring a car to cross the line under its own power in order to be classified.

The distance amounted to roughly half of the distance the 24 Hours of Le Mans winners covered at the time, and was similar in length to the 12 Hours of Sebring, which was also held in Florida in March. Starting in 1966, the Daytona race was extended to the same 24-hour length as Le Mans.

24-hour history
The first 24 Hour event in 1966 was won by Ken Miles and Lloyd Ruby driving a Ford Mk. II. Motor Sport reported: "For their first 24-hour race the basic organization was good, but the various officials in many cases were out of touch, childish and lacked the professional touch which one now finds at Watkins Glen." 

1966 also saw Suzy Dietrich enter the 24 Hours event, driving a Sunbeam Alpine with Janet Guthrie and Donna Mae Mims. The trio finished 32nd and, along with another women's team in the race, became the first women's teams to finish an international-standard 24-hour race.

After having lost in 1966 at Daytona, Sebring and Le Mans to the Fords, the Ferrari P series prototypes staged a 1–2–3 side-by-side parade finish at the banked finish line in 1967. The Ferrari 365 GTB/4 road car was given the unofficial name Ferrari Daytona in celebration of this victory.

Porsche repeated this show in their 1–2–3 win in the 1968 24 Hours. After the car of Gerhard Mitter had a big crash caused by tire failure in the banking, his teammate Rolf Stommelen supported the car of Vic Elford and Jochen Neerpasch. When the car of the longtime leaders Jo Siffert and Hans Herrmann dropped to second due to a technical problem, these two also joined the new leaders while continuing with their car. So Porsche managed to put 5 of 8 drivers on the center of the podium, plus Jo Schlesser and Joe Buzzetta finishing in third place, with only Mitter being left out.

Lola finished 1–2 in the 1969 24 Hours of Daytona. The winning car was the Penske Lola T70-Chevrolet of Mark Donohue and Chuck Parsons. Few spectators witnessed the achievement as Motor Sport reported: "The Daytona 24-Hour race draws a very small crowd, as can be seen from the empty stands in the background."

1970 saw the race with drivers strapped into their cars, and at the start, drove away. Since 1971, races begin with rolling starts.

In 1972, because of an FIA rule, the race was shortened to six hours, while the energy crisis led to the cancellation altogether in 1974. The Sports Car Club of America sanctioning was replaced by the International Motor Sports Association in 1975.

In 1982 the race continued on as part of the IMSA GT Championship instead of WSC.

In 2014, the race saw a dramatic crash involving Memo Gidley who was driving the pole-sitter DP and Matteo Malucelli, an amateur driver in a Ferrari 458 of the GTD category that has never won a race in North American Endurance. At the time of the impact, Malucelli was driving at less than 30 mph and keeping on the track while cars were passing him at 150 mph. Memo, who was side by side to another car couldn't have seen him and impacted front first. The race was subsequently red-flagged. Both drivers survived.

The regular teams were expanded to three drivers in the 1970s. Nowadays, four drivers compete typically because of the longer night driving. In the professional-based DPi Prototype and ACO GTE classes, all four drivers are usually professionals. In the ACO LMP2 and SRO Group GT3-based classes, many of these additional drivers are known as "amateur drivers," under current FIA specifications.  Amateur drivers are sportsman drivers that have built a career in a non-motorsport related occupation.  These type of drivers are typically eligible for IMSA's Jim Trueman and Bob Akin awards, awarded to the top driver who is not a professional at the end of season. These amateur drivers or overage professional drivers (FIA Silver or Bronze are typically for amateur drivers but professional drivers over 55 are automatically classified at this level) are required in the car for a specific number of hours.    Most often, the fourth driver in all classes is a Daytona-only professional driver of renown that most often has won a major professional championship, such as Scott Dixon, Jeff Gordon, Fernando Alonso, Shane van Gisbergen and Kyle Busch.

Unlike the Le Mans event, the Daytona race is conducted entirely over a closed course within the speedway arena without the use of any public streets. Most parts of the steep banking are included, interrupted with a chicane on the back straight and a sweeping, fast infield section which includes two hairpins. Unlike Le Mans, the race is held in wintertime, when nights are at their longest. There are lights installed around the circuit for night racing, although the infield section is still not as well-lit as the main oval. However, the stadium lights are turned on only to a level of 20%, similar to the stadium lighting setup at Le Mans, with brighter lights around the pit straight, and decent lighting similar to street lights around the circuit.

GTP

After several ownership changes at IMSA which changed the direction the organization followed, it was decided by the 1990s that the Daytona event would align with the Grand-Am series, a competitor of the American Le Mans Series, which, as its name implies, uses the same regulations as the Le Mans Series and the 24 Hours of Le Mans. The Grand Am series, though, is instead closely linked to NASCAR and the original ideas of IMSA and focused on controlled costs and close competition.

In order to make sports car racing less expensive than elsewhere, new rules were introduced in 2002. The dedicated Daytona Prototypes (DP) use less expensive materials and technologies and the car's simple aerodynamics reduce the development and testing costs. The DPs began racing in 2003 with six cars in the race.

Specialist chassis makers like Riley, Dallara, and Lola provide the DP cars for the teams and the engines are branded under the names of major car companies like Cadillac, Lexus, Ford, BMW, and Porsche.

2017 saw the introduction of the DPi prototypes, these cars were based on LMP2 chassis with a custom engine and bodywork from a major manufacturer

For 2023, the race will adopt the LMDh prototype specification, although Le Mans Hypercars will also be permitted. The series will also return to the Grand Touring Prototype name from the 1980's.

GT3

The Gran Turismo class cars at Daytona are closer to the road versions, similar to the GT3 class elsewhere. For example, the more standard Cup version of the Porsche 996 is used, instead of the usual RS/RSR racing versions. Recent Daytona entries also include BMW M3s and M6s, Porsche 911s, Chevy Camaros and Corvettes, Mazda RX-8s, Pontiac GTO.Rs, and Ferrari F430 Challenges. The Audi R8 and the Ferrari 458 Italia debuted in the 50th anniversary of the race in 2012.

From the era of the IMSA GTO and GTU until the 2015 rule changes, spaceframe cars clad in lookalike body panels to compete in GT (the new BMW M6, Chevrolet Camaro, and Mazda RX-8). These rules are similar to the old GTO specification, but with more restrictions. The intent of spaceframe cars is to allow teams to save money, especially after crashes, where teams can rebuild the cars for the next race at a much lower cost, or even redevelop cars, instead of having to write off an entire car after a crash or at the end of a year.

Starting in 2014 the GT Daytona class was restricted exclusively to Group GT3 cars. Alongside this came the GTLM class, using LM GTE cars, similar to the WEC. In 2022 the GTLM class was replaced by GTD Pro, using the same cars as GTD. A single GTLM car, the Corvette C8.R, was also permitted to compete in the class with its performance adjusted to the GTD cars.

GX Class
The 2013 race was the first and only year for the GX class. Six cars started in the event. The class consisted of purpose built production Porsche Cayman S and Mazda 6 racecars. Mazda debuted their first diesel racecar there which is the first time a diesel fuel racecar ever started at the Daytona 24. Throughout the race the Caymans were dominant, while all three Mazdas suffered premature engine failure and retired from the race. By a 9 lap lead, the #16 Napleton Porsche Cayman, driven by David Donohue, was the GX winner.

Most wins

Drivers with the most overall wins

Manufacturers
Porsche has the most overall victories of any manufacturer with 22, scored by various models, including the road based 911, 935 and 996. Porsche also won a record 11 consecutive races from 1977 to 1987 and won 18 out of 23 races from 1968 to 1991.

Engine manufacturers
In addition to their 18 wins as both car and engine manufacturers, Porsche has four wins solely as an engine manufacturer, in 1984, 1995, and two in the Daytona Prototype era in 2009 and 2010.

Overall winners

Notes:
  Races were red flagged during the event due to inclement weather, or a serious accident.
  Race record for most distance covered.

3-hour duration

2000 km distance

6-hour duration

References

External links

Rolex 24 at Daytona 
United SportsCar Championship official site

 
Endurance motor racing
Sports car races
Auto races in the United States
Motorsport in Daytona Beach, Florida
Rolex sponsorships
Recurring sporting events established in 1962
1962 establishments in Florida